Danilo Brestovac (born 3 February 1975) is a Macedonian retired handball player and current coach of GRK Tikveš.

Career
Danilo Brestovac was born in Skopje, North Macedonia.
His handball career began  as a goalkeeper in Vardar Vatrostalna and he also played in RK Tutunski Kombinat and RK Metalurg Skopje where he made it through to the quarter-finals of the Men’s EHF Champions League. After a playing career as a goalkeeper, he started coaching at club level, as assistant at RK Metalurg Skopje (2014/15) and then Chambery Handball (2015/16, 2016/17) before eventually moving up to a head coach in RK Metalurg Skopje. His career as a head couch moved an international level, by being selected as a head couch of the helping the Macedonia national junior handball team. and eventually head coach of the North Macedonia men's national handball team helping to qualify for the 2020 European Men's Handball Championship.

References

External links

1975 births
Macedonian male handball players
Living people
Sportspeople from Skopje
RK Vardar players
Handball coaches of international teams
Macedonian expatriate sportspeople in Luxembourg